Oda nova a Barcelona (Catalan: New ode to Barcelona) is a poem by Joan Maragall, written in 1909, two years before his death. It contains the topic of fascination with Barcelona, appearing as a temptress, as well as Catalan nationalist elements, and the linguistic situation reflecting on ongoing violence in the city, similarly to Paternal, which was set against the backdrop of the 1893 anarchist bombing of the Liceu. It poses the problem of war and urban violence, and the possibility of allegiance and regeneration.

See also
 A Barcelona, by Jacint Verdaguer
 Barcelona ja no és bona, by Jaime Gil de Biedma

References

External links
 The text
 The poetry of Joan Maragall

Catalan-language literature
Modernisme sculpture
1909 poems
Poetry by Joan Maragall
Barcelona in popular culture